This is a list of the automobiles that Volkswagen produced.

Current models

Passenger vehicles

Volkswagen Commercial Vehicles

Discontinued nameplates

Aircooled models
 Volkswagen 181 (1961–1983, also sold as Kurierwagen, Trekker, Thing, Safari)
 Volkswagen 411/412 (Type 4) (1967–1973)
 Volkswagen 1500/1600 (Type 3) (1961–1973)
 Volkswagen Beetle (Type 1) (1938–2003)
 Volkswagen Brasília (1973–1982)
 Volkswagen Country Buggy (1967–1969)
 Volkswagen Gacel (1983–1991)
 Volkswagen Hebmüller Cabriolet (1949–1953)
 Volkswagen Karmann Ghia (1955–1974, also sold as Type 34 Karmann Ghia, 1500 Karmann Ghia Coupe)
 Volkswagen Kommandeurswagen (1941–1944) staff car for Wehrmacht
 Volkswagen Kübelwagen (1940–1945) light military vehicle
 Volkswagen Schwimmwagen (1942–1944)
 Volkswagen Senda (1991–1994)
 Volkswagen SP1/SP2 (1973–1976)
 Volkswagen Type 18A (1949–?)
 Volkswagen Type 147 Kleinlieferwagen (1964–1974)
 Volkswagen-Porsche 914 (1969–1976, also sold as Porsche 914)

Watercooled models
 Volkswagen Ameo (2016–2020)
 Volkswagen Apollo (1990–1992)
 Volkswagen Atlantic (1981–1984)
 Volkswagen Beetle (2011–2019)
 Volkswagen C-Trek (2016–2018)
 Volkswagen Cabrio (1979–2002)
 Volkswagen Cabriolet (1979–2002)
 Volkswagen Carat (1987–1991)
 Volkswagen Caribe (1977–1987)
 Volkswagen Citi Golf (China) (1995–2001)
 Volkswagen Citi Golf (South Africa) (1984–2009)
 Volkswagen Clásico (2010–2014)
 Volkswagen Corrado (1988–1995)
 Volkswagen Corsar (1984–1988)
 Volkswagen Dasher (1974–1982)
 Volkswagen Derby (1977–1985), (1995–2009, also sold as Polo Classic)
 Volkswagen Eos (2006–2015)
 Volkswagen Fox (2003–2021)
 Volkswagen Golf Plus (2004–2014)
 Volkswagen Golf Sportsvan (2014–2020)
 Volkswagen Iltis (1978–1988)
 Volkswagen K70 (1968–1972)
 Volkswagen Logus (1993–1997)
 Volkswagen Lupo (1998–2005)
 Volkswagen New Beetle (1997–2011)
 Volkswagen Parati (1982–2013)
 Volkswagen Passat Lingyu (2005–2011)
 Volkswagen Phaeton (2002–2016)
 Volkswagen Pointer (1994–1996)
 Volkswagen Polo Playa (1996–2006)
 Volkswagen Quantum (1982–1988)
 Volkswagen Rabbit (1975–1984)
 Volkswagen Routan (2008–2014)
 Volkswagen Scirocco (1974–2017)
 Volkswagen Sharan (1995–2021)
 Volkswagen SpaceCross (2014–2019)
 Volkswagen Suran/SpaceFox (2006–2019)
 Volkswagen Taro (1989–1997)
 Volkswagen Vento/Polo Sedan (2010–2022)
 Volkswagen XL1 (2015–2016)

Volkswagen engines
List of Volkswagen Group engines

See also
Volkswagen Group

References

Volkswagen Group

Volkswagen